Saint Sauveur Melkite Greek Catholic Cathedral is a Melkite Greek Catholic cathedral in Montreal, Quebec, Canada. It is located at 10025 boulevard de l'Acadie in the borough of Ahuntsic-Cartierville. It serves as the eparchial seat of the Melkite Eparchy of Canada.

The building was designed by Gagnier et Villeneuve Architectes, with construction starting in 2006 and ending in 2007. It was dedicated on October 28, 2007. The cathedral has a capacity of 746 people.

References

External links
Melkite Eparchy of Canada – official website

Sauveur
Sauveur
Sauveur
Ahuntsic-Cartierville
Roman Catholic churches completed in 2007
21st-century Roman Catholic church buildings
Melkite Greek Catholic Church in Canada
Melkite Greek Catholic churches in Canada
Catholic cathedrals in Quebec
Church buildings with domes
2007 establishments in Quebec
21st-century religious buildings and structures in Canada